Lujmani (Aymara lujma a plant of the family Sapotaceae (possibly Pouteria lucuma) -ni a suffix to indicate ownership, "the one with the lujma", Hispanicized spelling Lucmani) is a mountain  in the Andes of Peru, about  high. It is located in the Arequipa Region, La Unión Province, Charcana District, and in the Paucar del Sara Sara Province, San José de Ushua District. It lies southwest of Chhulluni.

References 

Mountains of Peru
Mountains of Arequipa Region